Parmigiana, also called parmigiana di melanzane , melanzane alla parmigiana , or eggplant parmesan, is an Italian dish made with fried, sliced eggplant layered with cheese and tomato sauce, then baked. The origin of the dish is claimed by the Southern regions of Calabria, Campania, Apulia and Sicily. Other variations found outside Italy may include chicken, veal, or another type of meat cutlet or vegetable filling.

History 
There are several theories about the origin of the dish. Most frequently its invention is attributed to either Parma, Sicily or Naples. The case for Parma is that Parmigiana refers to Parma and because Parmigiano-Reggiano cheese is produced there. Sicilian food writers have several different explanations for a Sicilian origin. Authors Mary Taylor Simeti, Vincent Schiavelli, and several others write that the name derives from the Sicilian word for louver, . The angled horizontal slats of a louver would resemble the layering of eggplant slices in the dish.

Author Clifford A. Wright argues that the case for Parma is not convincing because Parmigiano-Reggiano was already widely traded since the 14th century. Parmigiano-Reggiano also was not an important ingredient in the original dish. Because eggplant was first introduced to Sicily and the other southern regions, it is more likely that an eggplant dish was invented there. Finally, the dish is popular in Campania in general, Naples in particular, as well as Sicily and Calabria, but not in Parma. Wright considers the case for a Sicilian origin speculative because there is no evidence to support it.

Wright traces the origin of parmigiana to Naples. The ancestor of the modern dish appears in Vincenzo Corrado's cookbook  from 1786. His recipe described eggplant seasoned with butter, herbs, cinnamon, other spices and grated Parmigiano-Reggiano cheese, which was then covered with a cream sauce of egg yolks before being baked in an oven. The modern version with Parmigiano-Reggiano and tomato ragù as key ingredients appears several years later in Ippolito Cavalcanti's cookbook , which was published in Naples in 1837. According to Wright, this suggests that the dish evolved in Naples during this time frame, which coincided with the increasing popularity of the tomato in Italian cuisine. Author Marlena Spieler agrees with a Neapolitan origin of the dish for the same reasons.

Preparation
The dish consists of sliced eggplant, pan fried in oil, layered with tomato sauce and cheese and baked in an oven. 

In some versions, the sliced filling is first dipped in beaten eggs and dredged in flour or breadcrumbs before frying. Some recipes use hard grated cheeses such as Parmigiano, while others use softer melting cheeses like mozzarella, or a combination of these.

Italian variations
In Cosenza, parmigiana is prepared with fried zucchini and baked eggplants. It is typically made in layers with grated fresh mozzarella and grated Parmigiano-Reggiano.

In Naples, parmigiana is also prepared using zucchini or artichokes in place of eggplants.

International variations
Variations made with breaded meat cutlets, such as veal and chicken, have been popularized in other countries, usually in areas of Italian immigration. In such areas, the original dish may be called eggplant parmigiana to distinguish it from the meat versions.

In the United States and Canada, chicken parmigiana and veal parmigiana are frequently served as a main course, often with a side of pasta. Chicken parmigiana is also served as the filling of a submarine sandwich. The alternative anglicization Parmesan is sometimes used instead, and the abbreviated form parm is common. The use of meats as an alternate to eggplant originated in the United States, where it was influenced by similar Italian dishes. A similar veal dish is known in Italian as cotoletta alla bolognese, which excludes tomato sauce but includes melted Parmesan cheese and prosciutto.  is another similar veal dish, but in Italy it is generally served without sauce or cheese. 

Chicken parmigiana is also a common dish in Australia and is often served with a side of chips or salad. In Australia, where the name is often shortened to parma or parmi, it may also contain a variety of toppings, including sliced ham or bacon.

In Argentina and in other neighboring South American countries, veal or chicken parmigiana is topped with ham and served with french fries. It is known as milanesa a la napolitana.

In England, parmo uses either pork or chicken topped with béchamel sauce instead of tomato sauce.

See also
 List of eggplant dishes
 List of veal dishes
 Carne pizzaiola

References

Cuisine of Sicily
Veal dishes
Italian chicken dishes
Eggplant dishes
Neapolitan cuisine